Gülağaç District is a district of Aksaray Province of Turkey. Its seat is the town Gülağaç. Its area is 326 km2, and its population is 19,443 (2021).

Composition
There are 4 municipalities in Gülağaç District:
 Demirci
 Gülağaç
 Gülpınar
 Saratlı

There are 9 villages in Gülağaç District:

 Akmezar
 Bekarlar
 Camiliören
 Çatalsu
 Kızılkaya
 Osmanlı
 Pınarbaşı
 Sofular
 Süleymanhüyüğü

Places of interest
The underground city of Kırkgöz in the town of Saratlı. The underground city of Çukurören in the town of Gülpınar.

References

Districts of Aksaray Province